The Deep Freeze Range is a rugged mountain range, over  long and about  wide, rising between Priestley and Campbell Glaciers in Victoria Land, Antarctica, and extending from the edge of the polar plateau to Terra Nova Bay. Peaks in the low and mid portions of the range were observed by early British expeditions to the Ross Sea.

The range was mapped in detail by the United States Geological Survey (USGS) from surveys and U.S. Navy air photos, 1955-63. It was named by the Advisory Committee on Antarctic Names in recognition of the support to research provided by the U.S. Navy's Operation Deep Freeze expeditions to Antarctica for many years beginning in 1954.


Geological features

Mount Adamson 
It was named by the northern party of New Zealand Geological Survey Antarctic Expedition (NZGSAE), 1965–66, for R. Adamson, a geologist with this party.

Mount Dickason 
It was first mapped by the Northern Party of the British Antarctic Expedition, 1910–13, and named for Harry Dickason, Royal Navy, a member of the Northern Party.

Mount Hewson 
Mount Hewson is a bluff-type mountain standing  WSW of Mount Adamson. It was named by the southern party of NZGSAE, 1962–63, for R.W. Hewson, leader and surveyor of this party; also a surveyor for the northern party of NZGSAE, 1961-62.

Mount Queensland 
It was discovered by the Discovery Expedition, 1901–04, which named this mountain for the state of Queensland, Australia, in recognition of the assistance given the expedition by its government.

Shafer Peak 
It was mapped by the USGS from surveys and U.S. Navy air photos, 1955-63. It was named by the Advisory Committee on Antarctic Names for Lieutenant Cdt. Willard G. Shafer, (CEC) U.S. Navy, officer in charge of the nuclear power plant at McMurdo Station, winter party 1965.

Cape Sastrugi
Cape Sastrugi projects from the west side of the range, overlooking the north portion of Nansen Ice Sheet.

Glaciers

Rebuff Glacier 
Rebuff Glacier is a tributary glacier which descends from the Deep Freeze Range before entering Campbell Glacier.

References

Mountain ranges of Victoria Land